1° de Mayo (May 1st) may refer to:

 1º de Mayo (Seville Metro), in Seville, Spain
 1° de Mayo (Mexibús, Line 1), in Ecatepec de Morelos, Mexico
 1° de Mayo (Mexibús, Line 2), in Ecatepec de Morelos, Mexico

See also 
 1º de Maio, a football club in São Tomé and Príncipe